Samurai is the second album by Matti Nykänen. It was released in 1993.

Track listing
"Samurai"
"Baby mä haluun sut"
"Markiisi De Sade"
"Syli"
"Niin yksin mä oon"
"Yy, kaa, koo, nee - vauhti kovenee"
"Hyppää letukkaan"
"Moottoritie on kuuma" (a Pelle Miljoona cover)
"Mimmi"
"Rakkauden laulu"

Matti Nykänen albums
1993 albums